The 2014–15 Kennesaw State Owls men's basketball team represented Kennesaw State University during the 2014–15 NCAA Division I men's basketball season. The Owls, led by first year head coach Jimmy Lallathin, played their home games at the KSU Convocation Center and were members of the Atlantic Sun Conference. They finished the season 10–22, 4–10 in A-Sun play to finish in a tie for sixth place. They lost in the quarterfinals of the A-Sun tournament to USC Upstate.

On March 23, 2015, Kennesaw State fired head coach Jimmy Lallathin after only one season. He took over as the interim coach midway through the 2013–14 season and was named the permanent head coach for 2014–15. He finished with a record of 10–22.

Roster

Schedule

|-
!colspan=9 style="background:#000000; color:#FDBB30;"| Regular season

|-
!colspan=9 style="background:#000000; color:#FDBB30;"| Atlantic Sun tournament

References

Kennesaw State Owls men's basketball seasons
Kennesaw State